David G. Offensend (born 1955) is the president and chief executive officer of the global nonprofit Education Development Center. He joined EDC after 10 years as the chief operating officer at the New York Public Library (NYPL). Offensend received his bachelor's degree from Princeton University and a Master of Business Administration from the Harvard Business School. He was replaced at NYPL by Iris Weinshall.

He was a co-founder of Evercore Partners and was senior advisor to the private equity business when he left in 2004 to join the New York Public Library, where he stayed until 2014. Prior to that, he worked for the Texas investor Robert M. Bass and Lehman Brothers. He is a trustee of Princeton University.

References

New York Public Library people
American chief operating officers
1955 births
Living people
Princeton University alumni
Harvard Business School alumni